Glenlogie or Bonnie Jeannie o Bethelnie is Child ballad number 238 (Roud 101).

Synopsis
Jeannie, fifteen or seventeen, sees Glenlogie and falls in love.  Various attempts to persuade her that he's unsuitable for her, either by offering another match or by pointing out the disparity of their stations, are unavailing.  Glenlogie hears and agrees to marry her.

External links
Glenlogie with several variants
Glenlogie with history

Child Ballads
Year of song unknown
Songwriter unknown